Ottocento is Italian for "eight hundred" and usually refers to the 19th century. It may also refer to:
 a variant of the tarot card game Tarocchini
 a 2010 album by Ödland
 a typeface developed by Nebiolo Printech

See also 
 Italian Neoclassical and 19th-century art
 History of Italy